Al Hilal Bank (Arabic: مصرف الهلال), Established in 2007, Al Hilal Bank is an Islamic bank headquartered in Abu Dhabi (UAE) offering  Shari’ah compliant Retail Banking, Treasury, and Wealth Management.

Al Hilal Bank was acquired by ADCB Group.  

With issued capital of AED 4 billion and paid-up capital of AED 3.5 billion, the Bank had credit ratings of A+ and A2 by Fitch and Moody’s respectively. The Bank has 14 retail branches across the UAE and 3 branches in Kazakhstan through which they offer digital-based services, enhancing the Bank’s performance-driven culture.

Al Hilal Group
Al Hilal Group comprises three adjunct Al Hilal Bank units:

Al Hilal Takaful
Al Hilal Takaful provides "Takaful" Islamic insurance products covering Property, Liability, Engineering, Marine, Aviation, Special Lines, Motor, Medical, and Credit Insurance.

Al Hilal Kazakhstan
Al Hilal Kazakhstan is the first Islamic bank in the Republic of Kazakhstan and Al Hilal's first branch outside of the UAE with Head Office in Almaty. The two other branches operate in the cities of Shymkent and Astana.

Mall branch is closed.

See also

List of banks
List of banks in United Arab Emirates

References

Islamic banks of the United Arab Emirates
2019 mergers and acquisitions